Azul Linhas Aéreas Brasileiras S/A (Azul Brazilian Airlines; or simply Azul) is a Brazilian airline based in Barueri, a suburb of São Paulo. The company's business model is to stimulate demand by providing frequent and affordable air service to underserved markets throughout Brazil. The company was named Azul ("Blue" in Portuguese) after a naming contest in 2008, where "Samba" was the other popular name. It was established on 5 May 2008 by Brazilian-born David Neeleman (founder of American low-cost airline JetBlue), with a fleet of 76 Embraer 195 jets. The airline began service on 15 December 2008.

According to the Brazilian Civil Aviation Authority (ANAC), between January and December 2019 Azul had 23.5% of the domestic and 5.0% of the international market shares in terms of revenue passenger kilometers (RPK), making it the third largest domestic and second largest international airline in Brazil.

History
Azul Linhas Aéreas Brasileiras S.A. was the fourth airline launched by JetBlue founder David Neeleman (after Morris Air, WestJet and jetBlue). Azul inaugurated services in the Brazilian domestic market on 15 December 2008 between Campinas and 3 cities: Rio de Janeiro, Salvador, and Porto Alegre. It launched operations with three Embraer 195 and two Embraer 190 aircraft. Another three aircraft were added in January 2009 to introduce nonstop service from Campinas to both Vitória and Curitiba.

On 28 May 2012, Azul announced the acquisition of TRIP Linhas Aéreas, the largest regional carrier in Brazil. Azul and Trip started comprehensive code-sharing operations on 2 December 2012, with all flights carrying only the IATA code of Azul. On 6 March 2013 Brazilian authorities gave the final approval for the merger with a few restrictions related to code-sharing with TAM Airlines and slot use at Rio de Janeiro-Santos Dumont Airport. On 6 May 2014 the merger process was completed with the final approval from Brazilian authorities. That day the brand TRIP ceased to exist and all TRIP assets were transferred to Azul.

While the airline is not currently a full member in an airline alliance, it signed a codeshare agreement with Star Alliance airline United Airlines in January 2014, which made it possible for MileagePlus members to earn points when flying with Azul beginning 1 April 2014. Since 2015, Azul is also an equal partner in a Brazilian-Portuguese joint venture that is the majority owner of TAP Air Portugal, another Star Alliance member.

In December 2014, Azul started its first scheduled international flights; to Fort Lauderdale on 2 December and Orlando on 15 December, both in the United States.

In early 2015, it was announced that Azul had signed a purchase agreement for 35 Airbus A320neo aircraft. It was also to lease a further 28 of the aircraft type. In mid-2015, Azul finalised a deal for 30 Embraer E195-E2 aircraft (including 20 options) first announced at the 2014 Farnborough International Air Show. The first delivery was scheduled for 2020.

On 24 November 2015, it was announced that the Chinese HNA Group, owner of Hainan Airlines, would invest US$450 million in Azul, becoming its largest single shareholder. This follows the US$100 million investment of United Airlines closed in June 2015.

Azul signed a non-binding deal to buy Avianca Brasil's assets on 11 March 2019, calling for the rehiring of all Avianca Brazil's staff and the merger between the two carriers, with Azul as the surviving brand.

On 14 January 2020, Azul Brazilian Airlines signed an agreement to purchase TwoFlex. On 27 March 2020, the Brazilian regulatory bodies gave the nihil obstat to the purchase and sale of flights started on 14 April 2020. TwoFlex operates as a feeder airline to Azul.

Destinations

Azul and Azul Conecta serve 160 destinations in Brazil, Portugal, the United States, and Uruguay plus some other additional locations by means of dedicated executive bus services to the nearest airports.

Codeshare agreements
Azul has interline agreements and codeshare agreements with the following airlines:

Codeshare agreement
 Ethiopian Airlines
 Emirates
 ITA Airways
 JetBlue Airways
 TAP Air Portugal
 Turkish Airlines
 United Airlines

Interline agreement
 Aerolíneas Argentinas
 Air Europa
 Copa Airlines
 Etihad Airways
 Hahn Air
 Hainan Airlines
 Lufthansa

Fleet

Current

The Azul Brazilian Airlines fleet consists of the following aircraft, :

The airline also operates 2 Pilatus PC-12/45 for logistics and maintenance support.

Loyalty program
TudoAzul is the frequent flyer program for Azul. Members accumulate points based on the airfare paid rather than on miles flown.

See also
List of airlines of Brazil

References

External links

Azul History sketch at Aviação Brasil

 
Airlines of Brazil
Airlines established in 2008
Brazilian brands
Low-cost carriers
Private equity portfolio companies
HNA Group
2008 establishments in Brazil